Reimann (Hebrew: ריימן) is a German and Jewish surname, also Reiman. Notable people with the surnames include:

 Aribert Reimann (born 1936), German composer and pianist
 Antonín Reimann (1888–1976), Czech American architect
 Brigitte Reimann (1933–1973), German writer
 Carola Reimann (born 1967), German politician
 Gotthold Reimann (1859–1932), Australian teacher of music
 Günter Reimann (1904–2005), German Jewish economist
 Hans Reimann (writer) (1889–1969), German writer
 Hans-Georg Reimann (born 1941), East German racewalker
 Hobart Reimann (1897–1986), American virologist and physician
 Heinrich Reimann (1850–1906), musicologist
 Joey Reiman (born 1953), American Jewish advertising businessman and author
 Katya Reimann (born 1965), novelist
 Leonid Reiman (born 1957), Russian politician
 Leopold Reimann, (1892–1917), German flying ace
 Lukas Reimann (Swiss politician) (born 1982)
 Max Reimann (1898–1977), German politician
 Pavel Reimann (1902-1976), Czech communist of Jewish origin and author
 Robert Reimann (Swiss politician) (1911–1987)
 Robert Reimann (United States Navy officer) (born c. 1936), U.S. Navy rear admiral
 William Reimann (born 1935) American Sculptor

See also 
 Compagnie Reiman, Jewish partisan Jewish French underground group
 Reiman Gardens
 Reimann School, The Reimann School of Art and Design
 Riemann (surname)
 Bernhard Riemann (1826-1866), German mathematician
 Riemann hypothesis

German-language surnames
Jewish surnames